Maleki (also Romanized as Malekī; also known as Deh-e Malekī) is a village in Margan Rural District, in the Central District of Hirmand County, Sistan and Baluchestan Province, Iran. At the 2006 census, its population was 280, in 48 families.

References 

Populated places in Hirmand County